Ada Township is a civil township of Kent County in the U.S. state of Michigan.  The population was 14,388 at the 2020 census.

The majority of the township is included in the Forest Hills census-designated place, which is used only for statistical purposes. The township is the corporate home of Alticor and its subsidiary companies Amway North America and Amway.

Communities
Ada, also known as Ada Village, is an unincorporated community within the township. Ada contains its own post office with the 49301 ZIP Code that serves the majority of the township. Ada was settled by white people as early as 1821 when Rix Robinson built a trading post near the area to trade furs with a local Ottawa village. Robinson made the first land purchase here in 1833, and a settlement developed along the Thornapple River. A post office was established in 1837. Both the township and village settlement were named for Ada Smith, the daughter of the first postmaster. The settlement was given a station on the Detroit and Milwaukee Railroad (later part of the Detroit, Grand Haven and Milwaukee Railway). A plat was recorded in 1857.

Forest Hills is an unincorporated community and census-designated place (CDP) that occupies the majority of the township for statistical purposes.  The CDP occupies  (or 88.90%) of the township.  Forest Hills also occupies a large portion of Cascade Township to the south and is the largest and most-populated CDP in the state.

History
At the turn of the 19th century, the land that would become Ada was a village of the Grand River Band of Ottawa, led by Nebawnaygezhick.

During the early colonial settlement of Michigan, Rix Robinson, the first permanent colonial settler of Kent County, married Sebequay ("River Woman"), the sister of Nebawnaygezhick, at Ada. In 1821, Robinson purchased a former French-Canadian trading post at the junction of the Grand and Thornapple rivers from Madeline La Framboise, on behalf of John Jacob Astor's American Fur Company. Land north of the Grand River was not available for purchase by European-American settlers until after the United States signed the 1836 Treaty of Washington with regional tribes. Following the treaty, Robinson purchased hundreds of acres around the mouth of the Thornapple for the Ottawa to continue living on.

There are conflicting reports concerning when the township was organized. Information provided by the township website indicates that Robinson was elected as the township's first supervisor. However, other sources indicate it was organized on April 2, 1838, and that Sydney Smith was elected the first supervisor and that Robinson was the second, elected in 1841 and again in 1844. A village was platted in 1858 at the mouth of the Thornapple River, but it developed slowly and never incorporated. The township originally included Townships 5, 6, and 7 North, Range 10 West and was split off from Walker and Kent Townships. Boundaries changed in 1840 to split off Caledonia Township (Township 5 North, Range 10 West) and in 1848 Cascade Township (the part of Township 6, Range 10 West lying south of the Grand River).

In 1843, State Legislature approved the board of supervisors to aid in construction of bridge across the Grand River near its junction with the Thornapple River. Land was appropriated in 1848 to aid in finishing this bridge.

In 1846, a state road was authorized by the State of Michigan Legislature from Hastings to the unincorporated village of Ada. 

The Ada Covered Bridge was constructed across the Thornapple in 1867. Listed on the National Register of Historic Places, it is one of nine covered bridges that remain standing in the state. The town board was authorized by act of Michigan Legislature in 1867 to borrow money for building and repairing this bridge. An earlier act in 1848 appropriated lands for building and repairing a bridge near the mouth of the Thornapple on the Cascade Road.

In 1877, voters authorized raising $3000 for purchasing a bridges across the Grand River.

Geography

The Grand River and the Thornapple River pass through the township.

Major highways
 runs west–east through the southern portion of the township.

Demographics
As of the census of 2000, there were 9,882 people, 3,263 households, and 2,802 families residing in the township. The racial makeup of the township was 95.57% White, 0.47% African American, 0.16% Native American, 2.35% Asian, 0.01% Pacific Islander, 0.51% from other races, and 0.94% from two or more races. Hispanic or Latino of any race were 1.07% of the population.

There were 3,263 households, out of which 47.1% had children under the age of 18 living with them, 78.7% were married couples living together, 5.4% had a female householder with no husband present, and 14.1% were non-families. 11.6% of all households were made up of individuals, and 3.7% had someone living alone who was 65 years of age or older. The average household size was 3.03 and the average family size was 3.30.

In the township the population was spread out, with 32.6% under the age of 18, 5.4% from 18 to 24, 27.6% from 25 to 44, 27.3% from 45 to 64, and 7.1% who were 65 years of age or older. The median age was 37 years. For every 100 females, there were 99.8 males. For every 100 females age 18 and over, there were 97.1 males.

The median income for a household in the township was $83,357, and the median income for a family was $87,972. Males had a median income of $61,795 versus $36,288 for females. The per capita income for the township was $37,840. About 1.1% of families and 1.9% of the population were below the poverty line, including 1.6% of those under age 18 and 2.8% of those age 65 or over.

Education
The Forest Hills Public Schools district serves most of the township, while Lowell Area Schools serves a smaller portion in the east.

Forest Hills Central High School and Forest Hills Eastern High School are located in Ada Township.  The Grand Rapids Supplemental School is a part-time Japanese school (hoshū jugyō kō) that holds its classes at Forest Hills Central High School.

Images

References

Further reading
 Information on Rix Robinson
 History and Directory of Kent County, Michigan. Dillenback and Leavitt. Grand Rapids, Mich.,: Daily Eagle Steam Printing House, 1870 p. 20
 Grand Rapids and Kent County, Michigan. Chicago [Ill.] : Robert O. Law Company, 1918. pp. 219++
 History of Kent County, Michigan. Leeson, M. A. Chicago: C. C. Chapman & co. 1881. p. 487+

External links 

 Ada Township official website
 Ada Business Association
 Ada Historical Society
 Forest Hills Public Schools

Townships in Michigan
Townships in Kent County, Michigan
Grand Rapids metropolitan area
Populated places established in 1858
1858 establishments in Michigan